The 1987–88 West Midlands (Regional) League season was the 88th in the history of the West Midlands (Regional) League, an English association football competition for semi-professional and amateur teams based in the West Midlands county, Shropshire, Herefordshire, Worcestershire and southern Staffordshire.

Premier Division

The Premier Division featured 18 clubs which competed in the division last season, along with one new club promoted from Division One:
Westfields

League table

References

External links

1987–88
8